Baburao Pacharne (died 11 August 2022) was an Indian politician, who was a member of the Maharashtra Legislative Assembly from 2014 to 2019 and also from 2004 to 2009. A member of the Bharatiya Janata Party (BJP), Pacharne represented the Shirur, Maharashtra as a MLA. He foresaw the possibility of implementing organic farming in the Shirur Taluka. Pacharne messaged to all farmers to be given use of a formula of zero budget natural farming. He had a keen interest in researching new techniques related to natural farming. This resulted in the emergence of "Shivtara Zero Budget Natural Farming at Shirur".

Early life
Pacharne came from a farming family, born in the small village near Shirur. He had completed primary educations in village, thereafter college in Shirur at Pune University.

Death
He died on 11 August 2022 after a long battle with cancer at the age of 71.

References

1950s births
2022 deaths
Marathi politicians
People from Pune district
Bharatiya Janata Party politicians from Maharashtra
Maharashtra MLAs 2014–2019
Year of birth missing